Bob Ostertag Plays the Aalto is the eleventh studio album by Bob Ostertag, self-released on October 21, 2013.

Track listing

Personnel
Adapted from the Bob Ostertag Plays the Aalto liner notes.

Musicians
 Bob Ostertag – Aalto synthesizer, liner notes

Release history

References

External links 
 Bob Ostertag Plays the Aalto at Bandcamp
 Bob Ostertag Plays the Aalto at Discogs (list of releases)

2013 albums
Bob Ostertag albums